In Greek mythology, Phthonus (Ancient Greek: Φθόνος Phthónos), or sometimes Zelus, was the personification of jealousy and envy, most prominently in matters of romance. In Nonnus's Dionysiaca, he is by proxy the cause of Semele's death, having informed Hera of Zeus's affair with the princess. He also appears in Callimachus's Hymn to Apollo, goading the god into an argument.

His female counterpart was Nemesis, personification of revenge. In contrast to Phthonus’ domain being closely tied to romantic and sexual jealousy, Nemesis was more closely related to violent retribution.

According to Irenaeus, Gnostics believed that the first angel and Authadia conceived the children Kakia (wickedness), Zelos (emulation), Phthonus (envy), Erinnys (fury), and Epithymia (lust).

References

Greek gods
Personifications in Greek mythology
Gnostic deities